Daniel Albert may refer to:
Daniel Albert (footballer) (born 1971), Israeli footballer
Daniel G. Albert (1901–1983), New York politician and judge 
Daniel M. Albert (born 1936), American ophthalmologist and cancer researcher